Paul Hendrik Roux (Hopetown, Cape Colony, 28 September 1862 – Beaufort-Wes, Cape Province, 8 June 1911) was a Second Boer War general and a Protestant pastor in the Dutch Reformed Church in South Africa (NGK).

Early career (1862-1899)
In 1862 Roux was born in the Cape Colony as the eldest son of Dirk Hendrik Dietz Roux (Paarl, 1821 - Paarl, 1895) and Francina Johanna Roux (from the Danish Wiid family, Hopetown, 1841 - Paarl, 1921). He studied at Stellenbosch Theological Institute in the years 1884-1889, and was ordained in 1891. Roux worked as an assistant preacher in Johannesburg and became a pastor in his own right at Vredefort (1891) in Orange Free State, and later at Senekal (1897).

Second Boer War (1899-1902)

Almoner and general
After the outbreak of the Second Boer War Roux served the troops from his home town of Senekal first as an almoner in the Colony of Natal, but later he was appointed general by Orange Free State president M. T. Steyn after general de Villiers was fatally wounded. In July 1900 he joined General Christiaan de Wet's Commando in the Brandwater Basin.

Arrest and imprisonment
Orange Free State General Marthinus Prinsloo and his men guarded the mountain passes of the Drakensberg while general De Wet would retreat northward with 2000 men. General Paul Roux would head to the south-west with another 2000 men, while general Jonathan Crowther would go east with 500 men. Indeed De Wet escaped escorting president Steyn, but the remainder of the army dithered, failed to defend the pass Slabbert's Nek and gave up the other pass of  Retief's Nek after a fight on 23–24 July 1900. 

Prinsloo and Roux quarelled as to who was in command. A first vote favoured Prinsloo, but later incoming votes gave Roux the edge. The British surrounded Prinsloo by also blocking the passes of Witnek, Kommandonek, and Noupoortsnek (Nauwpoortsnek), so that Prinsloo felt forced to surrender with all troops to general Archibald Hunter on 30 July 1900. 

However Roux disagreed and personally went to Hunter to protest, and was arrested on the spot. Some 4300 troops including Prinsloo, Roux and Crowther were taken prisoner of war near Fouriesburg, most of them at Surrender Hill. This was the largest number of Boers captured in the war so far, even more than the 4000 at the surrender of general Piet Cronjé at Paardeberg on 27 February 1900. The British sent most of the prisoners to Diyatalawa at Ceylon (Sri Lanka), including Roux himself. There Roux again worked as a pastor.
Prinsloo's surrender in 1900 was viewed by some of his compatriots as a treasonous act. Christiaan de Wet called it “a horrible murder of government, country and people” (Afrikaans: ’n gruwelike moord op regering, land en volk).

After the war (1902-1911) 

Roux returned from imprisonment at Ceylon and continued as a Dutch Reformed pastor at Senekal. In 1905 he became pastor at Beaufort-Wes, where he died in 1911 of sleeping sickness (African trypanosomiasis), contracted during his missionary work in Nyasaland (now Malawi). In his honour a memorial was erected in 1915 near the Dutch Reformed Church in Beaufort West. The town of Paul Roux was named after him.

See also
 Paul Roux, the South African town named after him

Bibliography
 Bossenbroek, M. P. and Yvette Rosenberg (Translator), The Boer War, Seven Stories Press, New York, NY, 2018. ISBN 9781609807474, 1609807472.
 De Wet, Christiaan Rudolf, Three Years War (October 1899 – June 1902), Archibald Constable and Co Ltd, Westminster, 1902. Translation of the original book in Dutch De strijd tusschen Boer en Brit, Amsterdam ; Pretoria, 1902.
 Pakenham, Thomas, The Boer War, George Weidenfeld & Nicolson, London, 1979. Abacus, 1992. ISBN 0 349 10466 2.
 Viljoen, B. J., My Reminiscences of the Anglo-Boer War, 1902.

References

1862 births
1911 deaths
People from the Northern Cape
Afrikaner people
People of the First Boer War
Orange Free State generals
South African military personnel
Orange Free State military personnel of the Second Boer War
Boer generals